Duchess of Portland was launched at Troon in 1826. In the next 40-some years she sailed as a West Indiaman, and then around Britain. In 1831 she survived a maritime incident. She foundered in 1867.

Career
Duchess of Portland first appeared in Lloyd's Register (LR) in 1826,

On 13 August 1831 Duchess of Portland, Miller, master, encountered a violent hurricane as she was sailing for England from Aux Cayes. The hurricane threw her on her beam ends and she stayed that way for eight hours. She lost one of her boats, several sails, and was obliged to cut away her spare spars. She arrived at Falmouth on 28 September.

Duchess of Portland was last listed in Lloyd's register in 1862. However, in December 1865 she stranded at Bridlington but was later refloated.

Fate
Duchess of Portland foundered 15 miles off Hartlepool on 12 February 1867 after taking in water. Crew were saved from the ship's boat. She had been sailing from Sunderland to Le Conquet with a cargo of coal. Her British registry was cancelled in 1869.

Citations

1826 ships
Age of Sail merchant ships of England
Maritime incidents in August 1831
Maritime incidents in February 1867